Lindow may refer to:

Places
Amt Lindow (Mark), collective municipality in the district of Ostprignitz-Ruppin, Brandenburg, Germany
Lindow (Mark), town in the Ostprignitz-Ruppin district, Brandenburg, Germany
Lindów, Masovian Voivodeship,  village in Żyrardów County, Masovian Voivodeship, Poland
Lindów, Silesian Voivodeship, village in Kłobuck County, Silesian Voivodeship, Poland
Lindow Common, Site of Special Scientific Interest in Wilmslow, Cheshire, England
Lindow Moss, peat bog in Cheshire, England
Lindow Woman, partial remains of a female bog body discovered at Lindow Moss
Lindow Man, preserved bog body of a man discovered at Lindow Moss

Persons
Al Lindow (1919–1989), American football player
John Lindow (born 1946), scholar of Old Norse and Scandinavian studies
Steven E. Lindow (born 1951), American plant pathologist